This article lists the squads for the 2021 SheBelieves Cup, the 6th edition of the SheBelieves Cup. The cup consisted of a series of friendly games, and was held in the United States from 18 to 24 February 2021. The four national teams involved in the tournament registered a squad of 23 players.

The age listed for each player is on 18 February 2021, the first day of the tournament. The numbers of caps and goals listed for each player do not include any matches played after the start of tournament. The club listed is the club for which the player last played a competitive match prior to the tournament. The nationality for each club reflects the national association (not the league) to which the club is affiliated. A flag is included for coaches that are of a different nationality than their own national team.

Squads

Argentina
Coach: Carlos Borrello

The preliminary squad was announced on 4 February 2021. The final squad was announced on 14 February 2021. A day later, Yanina Sosa replaced Vanina Correa, due to her testing positive for COVID-19. Two days after that, Sosa tested positive for COVID-19 and was replaced by Laurina Oliveros. On the same day, the Argentine Football Association released the squad numbers.

Brazil
Coach:  Pia Sundhage

The final squad was announced on 28 January 2021. On 11 February 2021, Kathellen replaced Fabiana, due to her testing positive for COVID-19. On 16 February 2021, Geyse and Valéria replaced Luana and Formiga, due to Paris Saint-Germain denying their release.

Canada
Coach:  Bev Priestman

The preliminary squad was announced on 25 January 2021. The final squad was announced on 16 February 2021.

United States
Coach:  Vlatko Andonovski

The final squad was announced on 1 February 2021. On 8 February 2021, Casey Krueger replaced Alana Cook, due to Paris Saint-Germain denying Cook's release. On 13 February 2021, Jaelin Howell replaced Sam Mewis, due to an ankle injury.

Player representation

By club
Clubs with 3 or more players represented are listed.

By club nationality

By club federation

By representatives of domestic league

References

2021